Rockford Township is located in Winnebago County, Illinois, United States. As of the 2010 census, its population was 178,527 and it contained 78,714 housing units.  It is the largest township, in terms of area, in Illinois. The city of Rockford, along with the villages of Cherry Valley and New Milford are all located in Rockford Township.

History
Township government for Winnebago County was formed on November 6, 1849. The township government didn't become effective  until the next year on April 1, 1850. Rockford Township would later annex two of the original sixteen townships of the county. On May 1, 1916, New Milford Township annexation was approved, followed by Guilford Township in 1929.

Geography

Demographics

References

External links
Winnebago County Official Site
Rockford Township Official Site

Townships in Winnebago County, Illinois
Rockford metropolitan area, Illinois
Townships in Illinois